John Thompson (3 April 1903 – 15 December 1985) was an  Australian rules footballer who played with North Melbourne in the Victorian Football League (VFL).

Notes

External links 

1903 births
1985 deaths
Australian rules footballers from Victoria (Australia)
North Melbourne Football Club players
Eaglehawk Football Club players